"Summertime" is a song by American rock band Bon Jovi, taken from their 2007 Lost Highway album. This song, unlike their last three singles, features a much heavier guitar part, similar to some older tracks off the Bounce and Crush albums.  This single was released only in Canada.

Chart performance

References

2007 songs
2007 singles
Bon Jovi songs
Songs written by Jon Bon Jovi
Songs written by Richie Sambora
Songs written by John Shanks
Song recordings produced by John Shanks
Island Records singles
Country rock songs